Ophidioidei is one of two suborders in the order Ophidiiformes, the cusk eels, viviparous brotulas and pearlfishes. The main distinction from the suborder Bythitoidei is that the Ophidioidei are oviparous, other features include having a caudal fin which is joined to both the anal fin and the dorsal fin forming an even combined fin which tapers to a point, a lack of an external intromittent organ in males and the anterior nostril is placed high above the mouth.

Families

The following families are classified in the suborder Ophidioidei:

 Carapidae Poey, 1867 – pearlfishes
 Ophidiidae Rafinesque, 1810 – cusk eels

References

Ophidiiformes
Taxa named by Samuel Garman